Solomon Barnard (born 14 February 1956) is a South African cricketer. He played in twelve first-class matches for Boland from 1981/82 to 1983/84.

See also
 List of Boland representative cricketers

References

External links
 

1956 births
Living people
South African cricketers
Boland cricketers
Sportspeople from Malmesbury